Alan David Halsall (born 11 August 1982) is an English actor, best known for portraying the role of Tyrone Dobbs in Coronation Street, a role he has played since 1998.

Early life

Halsall was brought up in Walkden, Salford and attended Walkden High School.

Career

Halsall has been in Coronation Street since November 1998, but had previously appeared in a variety of television shows including Heartbeat, Hetty Wainthropp Investigates and Queer As Folk (1999). He also appeared in the CITV four-part series Matt's Million.

Halsall won  the 2013 National Television Awards Outstanding Serial Drama Performance award for his role on  Coronation Street.

Awards and nominations

Personal life

Halsall was married to former Coronation Street and Wild at Heart actress, Lucy-Jo Hudson. They met on set and began dating in 2005. They married on 13 June 2009 in Cheshire. On 18 February 2013, via Twitter, the couple announced they were expecting their first child,  a baby girl. On 8 September 2013, Hudson gave birth to their daughter, 9 days after her due date, named Sienna-Rae. The couple announced they were splitting in March 2016, and they got back together after several weeks apart. In May 2018, they announced that they were divorcing.

References

External links
 

1982 births
Living people
English male child actors
English male soap opera actors
People educated at Walkden High School
People from Walkden
20th-century English male actors
21st-century English male actors
Male actors from Salford